Kalleh Sar-e Sofla (also Romanized as Kalleh Sar-e Soflá; also known as Kalleh Sar-e Pā’īn) is a village in Ojarud-e Shomali Rural District, in the Central District of Germi County, Ardabil Province, Iran. At the 2006 census, its population was 89, in 15 families.

References 

Towns and villages in Germi County